Li Mengwen (born 28 March 1995) is a Chinese professional footballer who plays as a right-back for Division 1 Féminine club Paris Saint-Germain, on loan from Chinese Women's Super League club Jiangsu, and the China national team.

Club career
Li started her senior club career with Jiangsu. On 2 September 2022, she joined French club Paris Saint-Germain on a season long loan deal.

International career
After playing for various age level national teams, Li made her senior team debut for China on 20 August 2018 in a 16–0 Asian Games win against Tajikistan. In July 2021, she was named in the squad for the 2020 Olympics.

In January 2022, Li was named in the squad for the 2022 AFC Women's Asian Cup. She played three matches in the tournament as China went on to win their ninth continental title.

Personal life
Li's father was a long-distance runner. Following her father's footsteps, she was a 400 metre athlete before switching her focus to football.

Career statistics

Club

International

Honours
Jiangsu
 Chinese Women's Super League: 2019
 Chinese Women's Cup: 2017, 2018, 2019
 Chinese Women's League Cup: 2018, 2019
 Chinese Women's Super Cup: 2019

China
 Asian Games silver medal: 2018
 AFC Women's Asian Cup: 2022
 EAFF E-1 Championship runner-up: 2022

References

External links
 

1995 births
Living people
Women's association football defenders
Chinese women's footballers
China women's international footballers
Footballers at the 2020 Summer Olympics
Olympic footballers of China
Asian Games medalists in football
Paris Saint-Germain Féminine players
Chinese Women's Super League players
Division 1 Féminine players
Chinese expatriate sportspeople in France
Expatriate women's footballers in France